The 2005-06 Milwaukee Bucks season was the team's 38th in the NBA. They began the season hoping to improve upon their 30-52 output from the previous season. They bested it by ten games, finishing 40-42, qualifying for the playoffs despite finishing last place in the Central Division.

Draft picks

Roster

Regular season

Season standings

z - clinched division title
y - clinched division title
x - clinched playoff spot

Record vs. opponents

Game log

|-style="background:#bbffbb;"
| 1 || November 1, 2005 || @ Philadelphia
| W 117–108
|Michael Redd (30)
|
|
| Wachovia Center17,705
| 1–0
|-style="background:#bbffbb;"
| 2 || November 2, 2005 || @ New Jersey
| W 110–96
|Mo Williams (23)
|
|
| Continental Airlines Arena20,098
| 2–0
|-style="background:#bbffbb;"
| 3 || November 5, 2005 || Miami
| W 105–100
|Michael Redd, Bobby Simmons (23)
|
|
| Bradley Center18,717
| 3–0
|-style="background:#fcc;"
| 4 || November 8, 2005 || Golden State
| L 103–110
|Michael Redd, Mo Williams (21)
|
|
| Bradley Center14,712
| 3–1
|-style="background:#bbffbb;"
| 5 || November 12, 2005 || Indiana
| W 103–102
|Michael Redd (28)
|
|
| Bradley Center17,894
| 4–1
|-style="background:#fcc;"
| 6 || November 15, 2005 || @ L. A. Clippers
| L 85–109
|Michael Redd, T. J. Ford (15)
|
|
| STAPLES Center14,938
| 4–2
|-style="background:#bbffbb;"
| 7 || November 16, 2005 || @ Golden State
| W 90–87
|Michael Redd (27)
|
|
| Oakland Arena16,752
| 5–2
|-style="background:#fcc;"
| 8 || November 18, 2005 || @ Sacramento
| L 82–103
|Joe Smith (21)
|
|
| ARCO Arena17,317
| 5–3
|-style="background:#fcc;"
| 9 || November 21, 2005 || @ Utah
| L 80–100
|Michael Redd (25)
|
|
| Delta Center16,176
| 5–4
|-style="background:#bbffbb;"
| 10 || November 23, 2005 || Philadelphia
| W 108–97
|Michael Redd (32)
|
|
| Bradley Center17,526
| 6–4
|-style="background:#fcc;"
| 11 || November 25, 2005 || @ Minnesota
| L 91–99
|Michael Redd (28)
|
|
| Target Center17,422
| 6–5
|-style="background:#bbffbb;"
| 13 || November 29, 2005 || Dallas
| W 113–111 OT
|
|
|
| Bradley Center14,996
| 7–6

|-style="background:#bbffbb;"
| 18 || December 10, 2005 || Cleveland
| W 111–106
|
|
|
| Bradley Center18,717
| 11–7
|-style="background:#fcc;"
| 22 || December 17, 2005 || Utah
| L 80–88
|
|
|
| Bradley Center16,827
| 13–9
|-style="background:#bbffbb;"
| 23 || December 20, 2005 || San Antonio
| W 109–107
|
|
|
| Bradley Center16,865
| 14–9

Playoffs

|- align="center" bgcolor="#ffcccc"
| 1
| April 23
| @ Detroit
| L 74–92
| Charlie Bell (13)
| Jamaal Magloire (9)
| Ford, Bogut (3)
| The Palace of Auburn Hills22,076
| 0–1
|- align="center" bgcolor="#ffcccc"
| 2
| April 26
| @ Detroit
| L 98–109
| Michael Redd (29)
| Andrew Bogut (13)
| Andrew Bogut (4)
| The Palace of Auburn Hills22,076
| 0–2
|- align="center" bgcolor="#ccffcc"
| 3
| April 29
| Detroit
| W 124–104
| Michael Redd (40)
| three players tied (7)
| T. J. Ford (15)
| Bradley Center18,717
| 1–2
|- align="center" bgcolor="#ffcccc"
| 4
| May 1
| Detroit
| L 99–109
| Michael Redd (33)
| Jamaal Magloire (12)
| Andrew Bogut (6)
| Bradley Center16,296
| 1–3
|- align="center" bgcolor="#ffcccc"
| 5
| May 3
| @ Detroit
| L 93–122
| Michael Redd (23)
| Michael Redd (9)
| T. J. Ford (6)
| The Palace of Auburn Hills22,076
| 1–4
|-

Player statistics
Source:

Season

Playoffs

Awards and records

Transactions

Trades

Free agents

References

See also

Milwaukee Bucks seasons
Milwaukee Bucks
Milwaukee Bucks
Milwaukee